The 2015 season was Chennaiyin FC's second season of Indian Super League. Chennayin defeated FC Goa 3–2 in the finals to win the season.

Squad
As of 21 December 2015:

Technical staff

Transfers

In:

Out:

Pre-season

Preliminary round

League table

Results summary

Results by round

Matches

Semi-finals

Finals

Squad statistics

Appearances and goals

|-
|}

Goal scorers

Disciplinary record

References 

Chennaiyin FC seasons
Chennaiyin